Wylie Buzza (born 2 March 1996) is a former professional Australian rules footballer who played for Geelong Football Club and Port Adelaide Football Club in the Australian Football League (AFL). He was delisted at the conclusion of the 2020 AFL Season. The former academy product was again listed by the Brisbane Lions in late 2021.

Early life
Buzza was raised in Gatton, Queensland and played in the Brisbane Lions academy as a youngster before he was drafted by Geelong with the sixty-ninth overall in the 2015 national draft.

AFL career
He made his debut in the draw against  at Spotless Stadium in round fifteen of the 2017 season, where he kicked two goals. 
Wylie welcomed being a cult hero at Geelong, provided he was not a dud cult hero.

Buzza played the 2021 season for the Werribee Football Club in the Victorian Football League.

Personal life
Buzza is currently studying a Bachelor of Business at Deakin University.

References

External links

 

1996 births
Living people
Geelong Football Club players
Mount Gravatt Football Club players
Werribee Football Club players
Australian rules footballers from Queensland